Charlotte Brown may refer to:

Charlotte Hawkins Brown (1883–1961), American educator and academic
Charlotte Brown (producer) (born 1943), American television writer, producer and director
Charlotte Blake Brown (1846–1904), American doctor
Charlotte L. Brown (1839–?), American civil rights activist
Charlotte Emerson Brown (1838–1895), first president of the General Federation of Women's Clubs